The Grand Master of the Order of Saint Lazarus was the leader of an order of chivalry that was established by the Holy See in the 12th century. A number of Masters of the order, eventually termed Grand Masters, have been listed by previous historians of the order.

The early history of the Order of Saint Lazarus, as in the case of several other medieval orders, is shrouded in a haze of reality and myth simply because the early historians of the various orders assumed the role of enthusiastic eulogists to the detriment of objective writing. The genealogists even went so far as to try tracing origins to personages and events in the Old Testament. The available early cartulary only confirms some of the individuals in the list.

To complicate it further, historical legacy and contingency is claimed by the modern Order of Saint Lazarus (statuted 1910): see Grand Masters of the Order of Saint Lazarus (statuted 1910).

List of Masters or Grand Masters
The following individuals have been elected as Masters or Grand Masters of the Order of Saint Lazarus, or any of its predecessor titles. Their highest title is shown here:

See also 
Grand Masters of the Order of Saint Lazarus (statuted 1910)
Grand Master (order)
List of Grand Masters of the Knights Hospitaller
Grand Magistry and Lieutenancies of the Order of the Holy Sepulchre
Grand Masters of the Teutonic Knights
Grand Masters of the Knights Templar

References

Bibliography

 
Saint Lazarus